Jonelle Cato (born 14 March 1995) is a Trinidad and Tobago footballer who plays as a defender for the Trinidad and Tobago women's national team.

International career
Cato played for Trinidad and Tobago at senior level in the 2018 CFU Women's Challenge Series and the 2018 CONCACAF Women's Championship (including its qualification).

International goals
Scores and results list Trinidad and Tobago' goal tally first.

References

External links

1995 births
Living people
Women's association football defenders
Trinidad and Tobago women's footballers
Trinidad and Tobago women's international footballers
Competitors at the 2018 Central American and Caribbean Games